Guericke is the remnant of a lunar impact crater at the north part of the Mare Nubium. It is named after German scientist Otto von Guericke. To the north-northwest lies the large Fra Mauro crater, along with the co-joined craters Parry and Bonpland. To the east are the craters Kundt and Davy.

The surviving rim of Guericke has been worn, battered, and partly submerged by the basaltic lava that covers the floor. The wall is now little more than a circular series of ridges that join with rises that flow to the north, northwest, and south. The flooded crater remnant Guericke F is attached to the southwest exterior. The interior flood has a few small rises in the otherwise nearly flat surface. Two craters (Guericke D and H) mark the floor in the southwest quadrant.

Satellite craters
By convention these features are identified on lunar maps by placing the letter on the side of the crater midpoint that is closest to Guericke.

The following craters have been renamed by the IAU.
 Guericke C — See Kundt.

References

External links

Guericke at The Moon Wiki

Related article
 

Impact craters on the Moon